Pleasant Green Methodist Episcopal Church is a historic African-American Methodist Episcopal church located at Seebert, Pocahontas County, West Virginia. It was built in 1888, and is a one-story, front-gable building with a standing seam metal roof, and clapboard siding.  The rectangular plan building measures approximately 26 feet, 8 inches, by 34 feet, 3 inches and has Gothic Revival style details.  The building features a central entrance bell tower.  Also on the property are the contributing parsonage (c. 1920) and cemetery.

It was listed on the National Register of Historic Places in 2012.

References

African-American history of West Virginia
Churches on the National Register of Historic Places in West Virginia
Carpenter Gothic church buildings in West Virginia
Churches completed in 1888
Buildings and structures in Pocahontas County, West Virginia
National Register of Historic Places in Pocahontas County, West Virginia